La Revancha (English title:The Revenge) is a Venezuelan telenovela written by Mariela Romero and produced by Venevisión in 1989.  This telenovela lasted 247 episodes and was distributed internationally by Venevisión International.

Rosalinda Serfaty and Jean Carlo Simancas starred as the main protagonists.

Synopsis
Fernando Maldonado, a powerful man involved in foul business kills Leonidas Torrealba, the owner of a neighboring farm in order to take over his property. Dolores, Mr. Torrealba's maid, is witness to the crime and runs away with Torrealbas two little girls, Mariana and Martha, but in her hectic crime scene getaway, Martha falls in a ravine and is left behind.

Twenty years later, Isamar Medina, Mariana's adopted name, one of Torrealba's lost daughters, has grown to become quite a beautiful young woman and a popular and friendly figure around the little town where her real father had his land savagely stolen from by Fernando Maldonado. For her own protection her adoptive parents have not revealed her true identity. Twenty years later, Isamar falls in love with Alejandro, a rich man who brings her much happiness. Her love for him is halted when she learns that he is Fernando Maldonado's son.

Meanwhile, Martha has reappeared. She is a young, wealthy woman who wants to find her little sister after 20 years and get even with those who murdered her father. Martha and Isamar will become rivals for the love of the same man, Alejandro. In its climactic moments, the girls discover their sibling relationship and unite to avenge the death of their father. As love always comes out victorious, Isamar and Alejandro get together and overcome their tragic past to give way to a lasting future.

Cast

Rosalinda Serfaty as Isamar Medina/Mariana Torrealba
Jean Carlo Simancas as Alejandro Maldonado
Abril Mendez as Martha Aguirre/Martha Torrealba
Daniel Alvarado as Reinaldo Maldonado
Carmen Julia Álvarez as Elisenda de Maldonado
Rafael Briceño as Padre Zacarías Peralta
Orangel Delfin as Fernando Maldonado
Chelo Rodriguez as Aurora Huscategui de Maldonado
Sandra Bruzzon as Daniela Vilarde
Yanis Chimaras as José Luis Alvarado
Agustina Martín as Carmen de Alvarado
Francisco Ferrari as José Ramón Alvarado
Reinaldo Lancaster as Leónidas Torrealba
Sandra Juhasz as Mercedes Ferreira
Yadira Casanova as Estefanía de Arroyo
Javier Díaz as Samuel Aguirre
Andreina Sánchez as Gabriela Santana
Simón Pestana as Argenis Falcón
Miguel de León as Leonardo ManriqueEsperanza Magaz as Providencia MedinaRafael Romero as Anselmo ColmenaresLuis Gerardo Nuñez as Julio CesarDaniela Alvarado as Gabriela SantanaJudith Vasquez as Sandra CastilloLuis Pérez Pons as Comisario VielmaFlor Bermudez as Isabel Hernández''

Version
In 2000 Venevision made a remake of the 2000 telenovela of the same name. Protagonists are Danna García, Jorge Reyes and Marcela Pezet.

References

External links

Opening Credits

1989 telenovelas
Venevisión telenovelas
1989 Venezuelan television series debuts
1989 Venezuelan television series endings
Venezuelan telenovelas
Spanish-language telenovelas
Television shows set in Venezuela